Blessed Charles Steeb (18 December 1773 – 15 December 1856) was a German priest of the Roman Catholic Church and the founder of the Sisters of Mercy of Verona. That order still exists. Steeb was originally a Lutheran but converted to Roman Catholicism while studying in Italy.

Pope Paul VI beatified him in 1975 after the recognition of a miracle that was attributed to his intercession. The cause still continues pending recognition of another miracle.

Life

Charles Steeb was born on 18 December 1773 to Lutheran parents. He travelled to France and studied in Paris as a teenager but fled during the French Revolution. He studied in Verona but contact with priests led to his conversion to Roman Catholicism. His parents disowned him when this was discovered.

Steeb was later ordained to the priesthood and ministered to the sick. He studied canon law and civil law in Pavia, and later went on to teach languages. He was the founder of the Sisters of Mercy of Verona.

He died in 1856.

Sainthood
The cause of sainthood commenced on 6 July 1963 despite the fact that the cause conducted preliminary work from 1949 to 1952. Pope Paul VI recognized his life of heroic virtue and named him to be Venerable on 19 November 1970, and later beatified him on 6 July 1975.

References

External links
Hagiography Circle
Saints SQPN
Istituto Sorelle della Misericordia di Verona

1773 births
1856 deaths
19th-century venerated Christians
Founders of Catholic religious communities
German beatified people